The Waseda Big Bears football program represents the Waseda University in college football. They are members of the Top 8 in the Kantoh Collegiate American Football Association.

External links
 

American football in Japan
1934 establishments in Japan
American football teams established in 1934